Kamila Zaripova (born 19 November 1998) is an Uzbekistani footballer who plays as a midfielder for Trabzonspor  in Turkey, and the Uzbekistan women's national team.

Club career 
In 2021, she moved to Turkey and signed with the re-established team Trabzonspor to play in the Turkish Women's Football Super League. By late July 2022, she returned home.

International career 
Zaripova capped for Uzbekistan at senior level during the 2018 AFC Women's Asian Cup qualification and the 2020 AFC Women's Olympic Qualifying Tournament.

International goals

See also 
List of Uzbekistan women's international footballers

References 

1998 births
Living people
Women's association football midfielders
Uzbekistani women's footballers
People from Olmaliq
Uzbekistan women's international footballers
Uzbekistani expatriate footballers
Expatriate women's footballers in Turkey
Uzbekistani expatriate sportspeople in Turkey
Turkish Women's Football Super League players
Trabzonspor women's players
21st-century Uzbekistani women